This is a list of the extreme points and extreme elevations in Wales.

Wales

Northernmost point – Middle Mouse, off Anglesey at 
Northernmost settlement – Llanlleiana, Anglesey at 
Southernmost point – Flat Holm, Cardiff, off Lavernock Point, Vale of Glamorgan at 
Southernmost settlement – Rhoose, Vale of Glamorgan at 
Westernmost point – The Smalls, Pembrokeshire
Westernmost settlement – Treginnis, Pembrokeshire at 
Easternmost point – Lady Park Wood, near Monmouth, Monmouthshire at 
The easternmost point of North Wales is a section of Llangollen canal at  52°55'49.0"N 2°43'33.4"W
Easternmost settlement – Chepstow, Monmouthshire at

Wales (mainland)

Northernmost point – Point of Ayr, Flintshire at 
Northernmost settlement – Talacre, Flintshire at 
Southernmost point – Breaksea Point, Vale of Glamorgan at 
Southernmost settlement – Rhoose, Vale of Glamorgan at 
Westernmost point – Pen Dal-aderyn, Pembrokeshire at 
Westernmost settlement – Treginnis, Pembrokeshire at 
Easternmost point – Lady Park Wood, near Monmouth, Monmouthshire at 
Easternmost settlement – Chepstow, Monmouthshire at

Centre point

The centre point of Wales is dependent on whether only the mainland is used for calculation or outlying islands as well.

One centre point is calculated to be near Cwmystwyth, Devil's Bridge, Ceredigion

Elevation extremes

Wales: Snowdon (Yr Wyddfa) in Snowdonia (Eryri) - 1,085 m (3,560 ft)

Many points are on, or near sea level, but due to high rainfall, there are no natural dry pieces of land below sea level - see rivers and lakes below.

Rivers and lakes

The largest natural lake in Wales is Bala Lake (Llyn Tegid). Llangorse Lake is second largest.

This is a table of the longest rivers in Wales.
Rivers only partly in Wales are included in this table in italics.

See also 
Centre points of the United Kingdom
Geography of Wales
Extreme points of the British Isles

References

Geography of Wales
Extreme
Wales